Wayne Kelly (born 19 March 1963) is a Canadian former swimmer. He competed in the men's 4 × 200 metre freestyle relay at the 1984 Summer Olympics.

References

External links
 

1963 births
Living people
Canadian male freestyle swimmers
Olympic swimmers of Canada
Swimmers at the 1984 Summer Olympics
People from Alma, Quebec
Sportspeople from Quebec
Universiade medalists in swimming
Universiade bronze medalists for Canada
Medalists at the 1983 Summer Universiade